Francis Toomey (8 February 1904 – 14 March 1992) was a New Zealand cricketer. He played three first-class matches for Otago between 1934 and 1936.

See also
 List of Otago representative cricketers

References

External links
 

1904 births
1992 deaths
New Zealand cricketers
Otago cricketers
Cricketers from Dunedin